Thousand Island Grange Hall, also known as 1000 Island Grange #593, is a historic grange hall located at Orleans in Jefferson County, New York. It was built about 1900 and is a long, rectangular two story frame building, 25 feet wide and 75 feet long, on a poured concrete foundation.

It was listed on the National Register of Historic Places in 1996.

References

Grange organizations and buildings in New York (state)
Grange buildings on the National Register of Historic Places in New York (state)
Cultural infrastructure completed in 1900
Buildings and structures in Jefferson County, New York
National Register of Historic Places in Jefferson County, New York